This page summarises the Australia national soccer team fixtures and results in 2009.

Summary

The start of the year consisted of alternating qualification matches for the 2011 AFC Asian Cup and the 2010 FIFA World Cup. When Australia met Japan in February, they were top of the group with three wins. A draw against Japan, a win against Uzbekistan and then another draw with Qatar was enough for Australia to qualify for the 2010 FIFA World Cup with two games to spare.

Asian Cup qualifying started poorly with a draw in Indonesia and a home loss to Kuwait although wins later in the year improved Australia's position in the group leading into the final fixtures in 2010.

Netherlands were ranked number three in the world at the time of visiting Sydney to play a friendly that finished nil-all.

Australia finished the year at 21 in the FIFA rankings; however, the September 2009 ranking saw Australia reach its highest ever position of 14.

Record

Match results

Friendlies

World Cup qualifiers

Asian Cup qualifiers

Goal scorers

References

2009 in Australian soccer
2009 national football team results
2009